Marthall is a village in the unitary authority of Cheshire East and the ceremonial county of Cheshire, England. It is around 3 miles from Knutsford.

The village is small; it has a village hall, a church and a pub (the Egerton Arms, on the outskirts of the nearby village of Chelford). In 1976, Marthall civil parish was formed in its present state by including the neighbouring village, Ollerton. Although they still keep their old identities and village boundaries, they come together in a shared parish council and other facilities. As the population measured at the 2011 Census was only minimal, details are included in the civil parish of Ollerton, Cheshire.

See also

Listed buildings in Marthall

References

External links

 Ollerton & Marthall Website
 Church Website 

Villages in Cheshire
Civil parishes in Cheshire